The Cult are an English rock band.

The Cult may also refer to:

 The Cult (album), a 1994 album from the rock group The Cult
 Cult (TV series), an American television series
 The Cult (TV series), a New Zealand serial drama television series
 Batman: The Cult, a 1988 Batman comic book mini-series
 The Cult,  a 1972 movie re-released in 1976 as The Manson Massacre

See also
 Cult (disambiguation)